The Young Pioneers/Jeunes Pionniers of Niger (1961–1974) was a non-communist youth paramilitary group, one of several set up in post independence Africa, funded by and modeled on the Israeli Nahal ("Fighting Pioneer Youth").

References

Pioneer movement
Youth organisations based in Niger